Saint Francis Hospital, Mutolere, commonly referred to as Mutolere Hospital, is a private, community hospital, in Mutolere, Kisoro District, in the Western Region of Uganda.

Location
This location, lies in extreme southwestern Uganda, close to the International borders with the Democratic Republic of the Congo and with the Republic of Rwanda. The geographical coordinates of Mutolere Hospital are: 01°15'45.0"S, 29°43'12.0"E (Latitude:-1.262500; Longitude:29.720000).

Overview
St. Francis Hospital, Mutolere is a private, non-profit, community hospital owned by the Roman Catholic Diocese of Kabale. It is accredited to the Uganda Catholic Medical Bureau, and it is administered by the Little Sisters of Saint Francis, a religious congregation. The hospital serves patients from within Kisoro District and from the neighboring districts of Rukungiri, Kanungu and Kabale. A percentage of their patients come from across the borders, in the Democratic Republic of the Congo and the Republic of Rwanda. Founded in 1947, the hospital also maintains a nurses and midwives training school, the Mutolere School of Nursing and Midwifery, established in 1984.

Community outreach
The hospital partners with organizations and individuals inside and outside Luanda to improve the lives of the community, where the hospital is located. One such partner is the non-profit organization, Sustain for Life which, in collaboration with Mutolere Hospital, provides "healthcare, preventative medicine and education" to the Batwa communities in Kisoro District, Uganda. The program has been operational since 2010.

See also
 List of hospitals in Uganda

References

External links
 Brief Description of Mutolere Hospital

Hospitals in Uganda
Kisoro District
Kigezi sub-region
1947 establishments in Uganda
Hospitals established in 1947
Hospital buildings completed in 1947
Western Region, Uganda
Teaching hospitals in Uganda
Catholic hospitals in Africa